Love Bomb may refer to:

Music

Albums
Love Bomb (Lynsey de Paul album) or the title song (see below), 1975
Love Bomb (The Tubes album), 1985
Love Bomb, by Bobby Braddock, 1980
Love Bomb - Live 1967-69, or the 1969 title song (see below), by Blossom Toes, 2009

Songs
"Love Bomb" (B'z song), English-language version of "Ai no Bakudan", 2012
"Love Bomb" (Lynsey de Paul song), 1975
"Love Bomb", by AC/DC from Ballbreaker, 1995
"Love Bomb", by Blossom Toes from If Only for a Moment, 1969
"Love Bomb", by Clare Grogan, 1987
"Love Bomb", by Fromis 9 from From.9, 2018
"Love Bomb", by Girls Aloud from Sound of the Underground, 2003
"Love Bomb", by Grinderman from Grinderman, 2007
"Love Bomb", by N.E.R.D. from Seeing Sounds, 2008
"Love Bomb", by Simon F of Intaferon
"Love Bomb", by Tinsley Ellis from The Hard Way, 2004

Other uses
Love Bomb, a fashion line by Lover
The Love Bomb, a podcast by Nico Tortorella

See also
Love bombing, an attempt to influence a person by demonstrations of affection